The Friedrich Order ( or Friedrichsorden) was an order of merit of the German Kingdom of Württemberg. It was instituted on 1 January 1830 by the second king of Württemberg, Wilhelm I in remembrance of his father, King Friedrich I. In 1918, the end of the monarchy meant the abolition of the order.

Classes
The order was created with a single class, conferring nobility. On 3 January 1856, the Order was recreated with four classes were created and on 29 September 1870 a Knight 1st Class and a military division with swords were added (existing Knights were appointed Knights 1st Class). In 1892 the "Medal of the Order of Frederick" was added to the order. An additional rank was created on 6 March 1899, the Grand Cross with Crown (or Crown of the Grand Cross).

The classes were:
Grand Cross with Crown
Grand Cross
Commander 1st Class
Commander 2nd Class
Knight 1st Class    
Knight 2nd Class
Medal

The ribbon was skyblue.

Recipients

Grand Crosses 

 Duke Adam of Württemberg
 Eugen von Albori
 Albrecht, Duke of Württemberg
 Alexander, Prince of Erbach-Schönberg
 Duke Alexander of Württemberg (1804–1885)
 Alexis, Prince of Bentheim and Steinfurt
 Prince August of Württemberg
 Gustav Bachmann
 Friedrich Wilhelm von Bismarck
 Herbert von Bismarck
 Max von Boehn (general)
 Paul von Breitenbach
 Bernhard von Bülow
 Stephan Burián von Rajecz
 Carl, Duke of Württemberg
 Charles I of Württemberg
 Bohuslav, Count Chotek of Chotkow and Wognin
 Constantine, Prince of Hohenzollern-Hechingen
 Ernst I, Prince of Hohenlohe-Langenburg
 Ernst II, Prince of Hohenlohe-Langenburg
 Géza Fejérváry
 Prince Frederick of Württemberg
 Woldemar Freedericksz
 Prince Friedrich Leopold of Prussia
 Friedrich von Gerok (officer)
 Colmar Freiherr von der Goltz
 Heinrich von Gossler
 Gottlieb Graf von Haeseler
 Wilhelm von Hahnke
 Heinrich VII, Prince Reuss of Köstritz
 Prince Hermann of Saxe-Weimar-Eisenach (1825–1901)
 Paul von Hindenburg
 Eberhard von Hofacker
 Dietrich von Hülsen-Haeseler
 Karl Anton, Prince of Hohenzollern
 Hans von Kirchbach
 Konstantin of Hohenlohe-Schillingsfürst
 Prince Kraft zu Hohenlohe-Ingelfingen
 Emich, 5th Prince of Leiningen
 Alexander von Linsingen
 Otto von Moser
 Georg Alexander von Müller
 Duke Nicholas of Württemberg
 Adolphe Niel
 Duke Paul Wilhelm of Württemberg
 Philipp Albrecht, Duke of Württemberg
 Philipp Ernst, 8th Prince of Hohenlohe-Schillingsfürst
 Duke Philipp of Württemberg
 Philipp, Prince of Eulenburg
 Hans von Plessen
 Antoni Wilhelm Radziwiłł
 Duke Robert of Württemberg
 Gustav Rümelin
 Willem Anne Schimmelpenninck van der Oye
 Alfred von Schlieffen
 Gustav von Senden-Bibran
 Francis, Duke of Teck
 Alfred von Tirpitz
 Reginald Tower
 Julius von Verdy du Vernois
 Eduard Vogel von Falckenstein
 Alfred von Waldersee
 Wilhelm Karl, Duke of Urach
 Wilhelm, Duke of Urach
 William II of Württemberg
 Duke William of Württemberg
 Duke Eugen of Württemberg (1846–1877)
 Ferdinand von Zeppelin
 August zu Eulenburg

Commanders 1st Class 

 Max von Bock und Polach
 Paul Puhallo von Brlog
 Josias von Heeringen
 Leopold von Ranke
 Martin Chales de Beaulieu
 Ewald von Lochow
 Friedrich von Scholl
 Karl von Wedel

Commanders 2nd Class 

 Karl von Bülow
 August von Heeringen
 Wilhelm Heye
 Eduard von Kallee
 Walther Reinhardt
 Prince Rudolf of Liechtenstein
 Ernst von Prittwitz und Gaffron
 Adolf von Trotha

Knights 1st Class 

 Paul Bader
 Ludwig Beck
 Gottlob Berger
 Moritz von Bissing
 Walther von Brauchitsch
 Charles of Solms-Hohensolms-Lich
 Kurt Eberhard
 Walther Fischer von Weikersthal
 Werner von Fritsch
 Curt Haase
 Paul Hausser
 Waldemar Henrici
 Leonhard Kaupisch
 Maximilian von Laffert
 Oswald Lutz
 Erich von Manstein
 Franz Mattenklott
 Curt von Morgen
 Erwin Rommel
 Richard Ruoff
 Ehrhard Schmidt
 Hans Schmidt (general of the Infantry)
 Hugo Sperrle
 Hans Graf von Sponeck
 Aaron Tänzer
 Walther Wever (general)

Knights 2nd Class 

 Carl Bolle
 Hermann Kling
 Friedrich Sixt von Armin

Others 

 Paul von Bruns
 Walther Schroth
 Oskar von Watter

References

Orders, decorations, and medals of Württemberg
1830 establishments in Germany
1918 disestablishments in Germany
19th-century establishments in Württemberg
Awards established in 1830
Awards disestablished in 1918